Claude Cuy y Mola (born 8 October 1957) is a French sports shooter. He competed in the mixed skeet event at the 1992 Summer Olympics.

References

1957 births
Living people
French male sport shooters
Olympic shooters of France
Shooters at the 1992 Summer Olympics
Sportspeople from Ariège (department)
20th-century French people